The RGN hand grenade (Ruchnaya Granata Nastupatel'naya, "Hand Grenade Offensive") is an offensive Soviet fragmentation hand grenade. It consists of a single layered aluminium pre-fragmented body. It is very similar to the defensive RGO hand grenade. The grenade shell consists of two internally serrated aluminium hemispheres. The UDZS fuze has both impact and time delay functions, the impact fuze arms after a pyrotechnic delay of 1 to 1.8 seconds. If the grenade strikes an object after this time a spherical lead shot filled impact weight will trigger detonation. If the grenade has not struck anything after 3.5 to 4 seconds the second pyrotechnic delay will detonate the grenade.

The grenade has a stated lethal radius of 4 meters to a maximum of 10 meters, and a safety radius of 25 meters with the fragments quickly losing effectiveness past the lethal radius due to the aluminum pre-fragmented body, which was designed similarly to the RGN-86 (a variant of the RGD-5). It can be thrown 30 to 40 meters. The grenade is currently in production in Russia and Ukraine, and is in service with a number of other countries.

History
The RGN and RGO grenades were developed under Project BAZALT ("Basalt") during the Soviet–Afghan War to supplement the RGD-5. When in combat in the mountains Russian troops found their grenades were less effective. The steep terrain often caused grenades to accidentally bounce or roll back towards the thrower's position and cause friendly casualties. The long fuse time allowed the enemy forces to get under cover - or even throw or knock the grenade back if they were lucky. The time delay fuze prevents friendly casualties if it impacts too soon or will air-burst over an enemy under cover if it hadn't impacted after 3.5 to 4 seconds. The impact fuze detonates when it hits any terrain - even sand, snow, or water.

See also
 List of Russian weaponry
 RGO hand grenade
 V40 Mini-Grenade

References

 Janes Infantry Weapons 1991-1992, 

Hand grenades of the Soviet Union
Fragmentation grenades